Bebbington is an English surname. Notable people with the surname include:

 Anthony Bebbington (born 1962), English university professor
 David W. Bebbington (born 1949), British historian
 Keith Bebbington (born 1943), English former footballer
 Mark Bebbington (born 1972), British concert pianist
 Warren Bebbington (born 1952), Australian professor
 William Bebbington (1856–1939), English cheese maker and politician

See also
 Bebington, small town in Merseyside, England